Joshua Joseph Jason Ishmel Clarke (born 5 July 1994) is an English professional footballer who plays as a right back or right winger. He is a graduate of the Brentford youth system and made over 80 appearances for the club between 2013 and his departure in 2020. After nearly two years out of the game (bisected by a non-playing spell with Wigan Athletic), Clarke dropped into non-League football to transfer to Dartford in 2021, for whom he played until early 2022.

Career

Brentford

Early years (2011–2015)
Clarke signed a two-year scholarship at League One club Brentford during the 2011 off-season, after being spotted while on a course at Southgate College. He also represented Middlesex Schools at U17 level. He progressed from the youth team to the Development Squad and signed a one-year professional contract for the 2013–14 season.

Clarke made his first team debut in a 5–0 League Cup second round defeat at Derby County in August 2013, playing the full 90 minutes. His second appearance came in a 2–1 Football League Trophy defeat to Peterborough United on 8 October, when he replaced Martin Fillo after 47 minutes. After finishing the 2013–14 season as the leading appearance-maker in the Development Squad, Clarke was promoted into the first team squad for the remainder of the League One season on 16 April 2014. With promotion to the Championship secured, he made his league debut when he replaced right back Nico Yennaris after 81 minutes of a 4–1 defeat to Colchester United 10 days later.

Clarke signed a new a one-year contract on 9 June 2014, but failed to feature at all in the first team during the 2014–15 season. He made 19 Development Squad appearances during the season, moved from right wing to right back and impressed sufficiently to sign a new one-year extension in late June 2015.

Breakthrough (2015–2018)
Clarke made his first senior Brentford appearance in over 15 months in the League Cup first round versus Oxford United on 11 August 2015 and was one of the few Bees players to offer any spark in the 4–0 defeat. An injury crisis saw him keep his place in the squad throughout August and September and he made three further appearances before departing on loan in October 2015. Nearly five months since his previous involvement, injury to right back Maxime Colin and the deployment of right back Nico Yennaris as a defensive midfielder saw Clarke embark on a run of 8 late-season appearances, which took his tally for 2015–16 to 12.

On 29 June 2016, Clarke signed a new two-year contract. He was an ever-present inclusion in matchday squads early in the 2016–17 season and scored his first goal for the club in a 4–1 victory over Reading on 27 September 2016. He scored again five matches later, with the opener in a 2–0 West London derby victory over Queen's Park Rangers. In mid-February 2017, he signed a new two-year contract extension. After a period on the bench, he broke back into the team late in the season and finished 2016–17 with 32 appearances and two goals.

Clarke began the 2017–18 season down the pecking order on the right side of defence and midfield, but he started in Brentford's EFL Cup matches in the opening weeks of the campaign. He scored his first goal of the season in the 4–1 EFL Cup second round victory over rivals Queens Park Rangers on 22 August 2017 and his performance was recognised with a place in the Team of the Round. He scored two goals in two matches in mid-September, in a 1–1 league draw with Reading and a late consolation in a 3–1 EFL Cup third round defeat to Norwich City. After a season-ending injury suffered by Rico Henry on 30 September, Clarke deputised at left back, after showing his versatility playing at right back and on both wings so far during the season. Clarke's performances during the first half of the season were recognised with a nomination for EFL Player of the Year at the 2017–18 London Football Awards and he finished the campaign with 32 appearances and three goals.

Later years (2018–2020) 
Manager Dean Smith's decision to establish a leadership group and appoint matchday captains during the 2018–19 season led to Clarke wearing the captain's armband for the first time in his Brentford career during a 1–0 EFL Cup second round victory over Cheltenham Town on 28 August 2018. Well down the pecking order, Clarke made just three appearances before leaving on loan for the remainder of the 2018–19 season in January 2019.

Well-down the pecking order, injury-troubled and having made just two appearances so far during the 2019–20 season, Clarke was made available for transfer during the winter transfer window in January 2020. On the final day of the window, his contract was terminated by mutual consent. Clarke made 84 appearances and scored five goals during -years as a professional at Griffin Park.

Carshalton Athletic (loans)
In December 2012, Clarke moved to Isthmian League Premier Division club Carshalton Athletic on a work experience loan deal and scored on his debut. Clarke returned to Griffin Park in January 2013 after making seven league appearances, but re-signed for the Robins the following month and remained with the club for the rest of the season. He made 17 league appearances and scored one goal during a season to forget for the club, in which it narrowly avoided relegation.

Maidenhead United (loan)
Clarke moved to Conference South club Maidenhead United on a one-month loan on 4 December 2013. His spell at Maidenhead was hit by postponements due to bad weather and he returned to Brentford on 6 January 2014, after making just two appearances.

Braintree Town (loan)
On 17 February 2014, Clarke joined Conference Premier club Braintree Town on a one-month loan. He failed to win a call into a matchday squad and returned to Brentford when his loan expired.

Dagenham & Redbridge (loan)
Clarke joined League Two club Dagenham & Redbridge on a 28-day youth loan on 22 August 2014. His only involvement with the first team came when he was an unused substitute during the following day's match versus Mansfield Town. Failure to recover from a thigh injury saw Clarke return to Brentford when his loan expired.

Stevenage (loan)
Clarke joined League Two club Stevenage on a one-month youth loan on 17 October 2014. After just one substitute appearance and two further unused substitute appearances, Clarke was left out of the squad altogether and returned to Brentford when his loan expired.

Barnet (loan)
On 15 October 2015, Clarke joined League Two club Barnet on loan until 3 January 2016. He made a dream start to his time at The Hive, scoring three goals in his first four matches. On 28 November, Clarke received the first red card of his career for two bookable offences during the first half of a 3–1 defeat to Mansfield Town. After serving his suspension, he made two further appearances before suffering a hamstring injury. Clarke returned to Brentford when his loan expired, having made 10 appearances and scored three goals.

Burton Albion (loan)

On 11 January 2019, Clarke joined League One club Burton Albion on loan until the end of the 2018–19 season. Either side of an ankle injury, he made just six appearances during his spell.

Wigan Athletic 
On 11 September 2020, Clarke signed a one-month contract with newly-relegated League One club Wigan Athletic. A hamstring injury saw him fail to win a call into a matchday squad and his contract was terminated by mutual consent on 5 October.

Leyton Orient (trial) 
In July 2021, Clarke signed a short-term contract as a trialist with League Two club Leyton Orient and he appeared in all but one of the club's 2021–22 pre-season friendlies.

Dartford 
In mid-November 2021, Clarke signed a contract with National League South club Dartford. He made 10 appearances before departing the club in February 2022, in order "to focus on resolving some injury issues and getting fit for next season". He was a part of the team which emerged victorious in the delayed 2020 Kent Senior Cup Final, played on 24 November 2021.

Career statistics

Honours
Dartford
Kent Senior Cup: 2019–20

References

External links

 

1994 births
Living people
English footballers
Brentford F.C. players
People from Walthamstow
Carshalton Athletic F.C. players
Maidenhead United F.C. players
Braintree Town F.C. players
Dagenham & Redbridge F.C. players
Stevenage F.C. players
National League (English football) players
Isthmian League players
English Football League players
Black British sportsmen
Association football fullbacks
Barnet F.C. players
Burton Albion F.C. players
Dartford F.C. players
Association football wingers
Wigan Athletic F.C. players